Amanda Nicole Poach (born July 25, 1987) is an American soccer midfield player from Bowie, Maryland.
Poach represented the United States at the 2006 FIFA U-20 Women's World Championship where the team finished in fourth place.

References

External links
 
 U.S. Soccer player profile
Santa Clara player profile

Santa Clara Broncos women's soccer players
Living people
1987 births
Women's association football midfielders
American women's soccer players
United States women's under-20 international soccer players